Malilipot, officially the Municipality of Malilipot, is a 4th class municipality in the province of Albay, Philippines. According to the 2020 census, it has a population of 40,857 people.

History

Malilipot traces its history to the expedition of Juan de Salcedo in 1573 and the colonization of Albay Bay, now called Albay, with 120 soldiers and guides. During these period, towns were established. Libon was founded in 1573, Polangui in 1589, Oas in 1587, and Malinao in 1600. Other municipalities were established in succession.

Malilipot was officially founded as a municipality on October 26, 1945.

Geography

According to the Philippine Statistics Authority, the municipality has a land area of  constituting  of the  total area of Albay.

Barangays
Malilipot is politically subdivided into 18 barangays.

The sitios of Calbayog and Canaway were converted into a barrios in 1959 and 1957, respectively.

Climate

Demographics

In the 2020 census, Malilipot had a population of 40,857.

Economy

References

External links
 [ Philippine Standard Geographic Code]

Municipalities of Albay